Pan Zhengmin (born 1969) is a Chinese entrepreneur, the co-founder (along with his wife Ingrid Wu) of Shenzhen AAC Technologies, an electronic components company.

Early life
Pan Zhengmin was born in 1969, and educated at Jiangsu Province Wujin Teacher School.

Career
Along with his wife Ingrid, Pan Zhengmin co-founded AAC Technologies of Shenzhen, an electronic components company.

Personal life
He is married to Ingrid and lives in Shenzhen, China.

References

1969 births
Living people
Businesspeople from Changzhou
Billionaires from Jiangsu
Chinese technology company founders